is a railway station on the East Japan Railway Company (JR East) Tsugaru Line located in the city of Aomori, Aomori Prefecture, Japan.

Lines

Station layout
Ushirogata Station has one side platform serving a single bi-directional traffic. The station is unattended. The short platform requires that trains longer than five carriages use a door cut system.

History
Ushirogata Station was opened on December 5, 1951 as a station on the Japanese National Railways (JNR). Scheduled freight operations were discontinued from October 1968. On April 1, 1970, it became a kan'i itaku station, operated by the Japan Travel Bureau. With the privatization of the JNR on April 1, 1987, it came under the operational control of JR East. It has been unattended since September 2009.

Route bus
Ushirogata-Jidokan-mae bus stop
Aomori municipal Bus
For.Ushirogata
For.Furukawa via Okunai and Jyusannmori (Aburakawa)

Surrounding area

Aomori city hall Ushirogata branch
Ushirogata Post Office
Ushirogata Elementary School

See also
List of railway stations in Japan

External links

 

Stations of East Japan Railway Company
Railway stations in Aomori Prefecture
Tsugaru Line
Aomori (city)
Railway stations in Japan opened in 1951